Gekijōban Zero, also known as Fatal Frame: The Movie, is a 2014 Japanese horror film directed by Mari Asato, starring Ayami Nakajō and Aoi Morikawa, and based on a novelization by Eiji Ōtsuka of the Fatal Frame video game series. It was released on 26 September 2014.

Gekijōban Zero premiered in North America on July 28, 2015, at the 19th Fantasia International Film Festival.

Plot
Aya, the most popular student of a Catholic all-girls school, suddenly shuts herself in her room. Her admirer, Kasumi Nohara, kisses her photo at midnight and suddenly disappears with her friend Michi as a witness. Her disappearance is quickly attributed to a supposed curse that affects girls who kiss the photo of the person they admire at midnight. Aya's photo is taken to the attic by Sakuya Itsuki and Risa for safekeeping, but the two alongside three other girls are enticed to kiss the photo. Except for Risa, who is later found dazed but alive, all of them are eventually found dead at a nearby river.

When Michi attempts to kiss the photo, Aya stops her and reveals that she is not responsible for the curse, as the photo is not hers. They search help in Kazumi "Mary" Kusanagi, an eccentric photographer, who keeps photos inside her studio of lesbian girls who made a suicide pact by drowning themselves at a lake, which is now closed, due to society's intolerance towards same-sex couples. She also tells a story about a couple who was doomed when one of them refused to commit suicide, causing her to be haunted by her lover for the rest of her life. Aya then admits to Michi that she is haunted by the guilt of letting a fellow orphan of hers die in front of her.

Michi decides to kiss the photo to put herself into the curse and chains herself to Aya so the latter can save her should she be in danger. However, the two are separated halfway through and Aya is knocked out by Takashi, the mentally handicapped brother of the school nun, Mayumi Aso. She is thrown into a reservoir located at the place where the lesbian couples committed their suicides. There, Aya remembers that the doppelgänger is in fact her twin sister, Maya. Though she died at an early age, Maya "grew up" alongside Aya and put a curse at the photo until Aya could find her in the reservoir. Meanwhile, Michi is about to be drowned by Mayumi, who is revealed to be the one murdering the girls so as to keep Takashi's supposed involvement in Maya's death a secret, but she chooses to drown herself with Takashi when the authorities are closing in. Michi goes to the reservoir and reunites with Aya.

Aya and Michi participate in the school choir celebrating their graduation. Meanwhile, Mary visits the school's headmistress and abbess, correctly deducing her as the lesbian girl who was haunted by the spirit of her lover. The headmistress reveals that to keep her lover from bothering her, she murdered Maya so the latter could accompany her, though she is distressed when the act led to more murders by Mayumi, although her brother had nothing to do with it. After the choir, Michi bids Aya goodbye before she departs for Tokyo to attend a photography college. She is about to take a photo of her, but pulls up at the last second and makes Aya promise to wait for her until she has become a proper photographer.

Cast and characters
Ayami Nakajō as Aya Tsukimori 
Aoi Morikawa as Michi Kazato
Fujiko Kojima as Risa
Karen Miyama as Sakuya Itsuki
Kasumi Yamaya as Kasumi Nohara
Minori Hagiwara as Waka Fujii
Yuri Nakamura as Mayumi Aso
Kōdai Asaka as Takashi Aso
Noriko Nakagoshi as Kazumi "Mary" Kusanagi
Jun Miho as Headmistress

Reception
The film grossed  at the Japanese box office. Combined, the film grossed  in East Asia.

Richard Eisenbeis from Kotaku gave the film a positive review. He commented that the best aspect of the movie is the way in which it is told. Rather than focusing solely on Michi, the movie constantly shown the story through many viewpoints other than her own, which intertwining with each other and slowly expose the truth behind the mystery in the film. He found it interesting that a large portion of the story revolves around being a lesbian in Japan not only during the modern era, but also at Meiji era. He also noted that the movie's "intensely creepy and atmospheric" tone are what builds the fear, a feat many horror films could not hope to accomplish. Conversely, he has a mixed review for the lack of ghost killing via camera in the film, which is supposed to be one of pivotal elements in the game franchise. Nevertheless, he noted that the movie is a film very much worthy of the Fatal Frame name, and stated that "if you are a fan of Fatal Frame or Japanese horror in general, this is most certainly a film to watch".

See also
 List of films based on video games
 List of LGBT-related films directed by women

References

Further reading

External links
   (Archive)
  Gekijô-ban: Zero (Fatal Frame) at FilmAffinity
 
 Gekijoban Zero at Japanese Film Database

2014 horror films
2014 LGBT-related films
Films based on Japanese novels
Films directed by Mari Asato
Japanese horror films
Japanese LGBT-related films
Lesbian-related films
Live-action films based on video games
2010s psychological horror films
Japanese supernatural horror films
LGBT-related horror films
Japanese psychological horror films
2010s Japanese films
2010s Japanese-language films